Siteni Taukamo (born 2004) is a Greece international rugby league footballer who plays as a er or  for the Cronulla-Sutherland Sharks in the NRL.

Background
Taukamo is of Greek, Tongan and New Zealand descent.

He played his junior rugby league for the Gymea Gorillas before being signed by the Cronulla-Sutherland Sharks. He is the younger brother of fellow Greek international, Tyrone Taukamo.

Playing career
Taukamo captained the Sharks' Harold Matthews Cup squad during the 2020 and 2021 seasons. On 18 July 2020, Taukamo signed a four-year contract with the club until the end of 2024, transitioning into the first grade squad in 2023.

2022
In 2022, Taukamo was named in the Greece squad for the 2021 Rugby League World Cup, the first ever Greek rugby league squad to compete in a World Cup. Taukamo was initially left out of Greece's 24-man squad due to uncertainty around his age. In Greece's opening match, Taukamo made history by scoring the country's first ever World Cup try.
In Greece's final group stage match, Taukamo scored their only try during a record 94-4 loss against England at Bramall Lane in Sheffield.

2023
Taukamo will be a part of the Sharks' top 30 squad for the 2023 NRL season.

References

External links
Greek profile

2004 births
Living people
Australian rugby league players
Australian people of Greek descent
Australian sportspeople of Tongan descent
Australian people of New Zealand descent
Greece national rugby league team players
Rugby league players from Sydney
Rugby league fullbacks
Rugby league wingers